The 2012 Genesis was a professional wrestling pay-per-view (PPV) event produced by the Total Nonstop Action Wrestling (TNA) promotion, that took place on January 8, 2012 at Impact Wrestling Zone in Orlando, Florida. It was the seventh event under the Genesis chronology and first event of the 2012 TNA PPV schedule.

The main event of Genesis saw Bobby Roode successfully defend the TNA World Heavyweight Championship against Jeff Hardy. Other matches on the card had Kurt Angle defeating James Storm in a singles match, Crimson and Matt Morgan defending the TNA World Tag Team Championship facing Samoa Joe and Magnus, Abyss triumphant in a Monster's Ball match against Bully Ray, and Austin Aries retaining the TNA X Division Championship in a Four-Corners Elimination match against Kid Kash, Jesse Sorensen and Zema Ion.

In October 2017, with the launch of the Global Wrestling Network, the event became available to stream on demand.

Storylines

Genesis featured eight professional wrestling matches that involved different wrestlers from pre-existing scripted feuds and storylines. Wrestlers portrayed villains, heroes, or less distinguishable characters in the scripted events that built tension and culminated in a wrestling match or series of matches.

The main feud entering Genesis was centered on Jeff Hardy and defending champion Bobby Roode, competing over for the TNA World Heavyweight Championship. At Final Resolution, Bobby Roode went to a draw with A.J. Styles in a 30 Minute Iron Man match to retain his championship and Jeff Hardy defeated Jeff Jarrett in a stipulated Cage match to earn his shot at the World Title, as in turn, Jarrett's loss meant that he and Karen would be fired from the company.

Another main rivalry featured Kurt Angle in a singles match with James Storm for the second consecutive time on PPV. On the December 15 edition of Impact Wrestling, Angle complained to TNA General Manager Sting and provided the belief that Sting, giving him 90 minutes to spare for preparation, threw him into TNA World Heavyweight Championship match with Storm, who screwed him out of his World Title reign using a "loaded" superkick in their match back in October and at Final Resolution, expressing his desire for a rematch. However, Sting felt Storm beat him fairly twice and a third match was unnecessary. Unhappy, Angle declared he would beat down people in Storm's hometown until he gets his rematch. The following week, Storm admitted that Angle controlled 3 quarters of their match, but that he Tim Tebow'd Angle in the 4th quarter. In response, Angle appeared via video screen targeting and later attacking people at Storm's favorite local bar in his hometown of Nashville, Tennessee, in an effort to get Storm to give in. The following week, Storm accepted the rematch by retaliating with a Last Call superkick to Angle during his match with Rob Van Dam, resulting in Angle picking up the disqualification victory.

Another feud was between two former Immortal associates, Abyss and Bully Ray, heading into Genesis to compete in a Monster's Ball match, where if Abyss lost, he would have to rejoin Immortal. At Turning Point, after his separation from Immortal, Abyss partnered with Mr. Anderson to defeat his former Immortal allies and new enemies, Bully Ray and Scott Steiner. On the December 15 edition of Impact Wrestling, Abyss, forced to coexist with Immortal, was randomly drawn to team with Steiner in wake of the Wild Card Tournament to decide new contenders for the Tag Titles. As expected, Abyss turned on Steiner lifting him up around the torso from the side and executing the Black Hole Slam in their semifinal match against A.J Styles and Kazarian, giving them the win. Afterwards, Ray knocked the actions of Abyss as being "deplorable" after all Immortal did for him. Upon asking Abyss what he wanted, Abyss challenged Ray to a Monster's Ball match and agreed to rejoin Immortal if he lost.

Aligned with Ric Flair as his manager, Immortal member Gunner began a mission of destruction that started with former Immortal referee, Garett Bischoff, who managed two pinfall victories over Gunner that enraged him enough to piledrive Bischoff into the exposed concrete floor, consequently sidelining him in terms of storyline. The next victims lined up were Jesse Neal and Douglas Williams over the next following weeks. On the January 5 edition of Impact Wrestling, TNA General Manager Sting banned Flair from accompanying Gunner to the ring to even out the playing field in Gunner's match against Rob Van Dam, which ended in a double countout after Gunner's pernicious tactics backfired when Van Dam back body dropped him onto the concrete floor. The rematch was later announced to take place at Genesis.

The personal feud between D'Angelo Dinero and Devon reached a climax over their relationship with Devon's own kids. In June, Dinero played the good Samaritan by aiding Devon in his feud with Mexican America, but Devon tried to reject the help because of Dinero's influence on his sons, Terrell and Terrence. Two months later, Devon altered his attitude toward Dinero for the better and by September, they both began teaming up in unavailing efforts to capture the TNA World Tag Team Championship with their tag title match at Final Resolution being the second time. However, the losses had its effect and on the following Impact, Devon addressed his issues with Dinero, fed up with Dinero trying to assume his parental role, but Dinero asserted that his kids wanted a "cool Dad" keeping up with the times and not clinging onto the past. Due to his strong influence, Dinero, who turned on Devon, was also able to convince Devon's kids to turn on their own father, claiming that they were now his kids. The next week, before an attack by Devon ensued, Dinero announced his match against Devon at Genesis.

Samoa Joe and Magnus took on defending champions Matt Morgan and Crimson for the TNA World Tag Team Championship. This match came together based on a Wild Card Tournament that was instituted in order to randomly pair wrestlers together to decide number one contenders to the Tag Titles. Joe and Magnus advanced the whole way through, last beating A.J Styles and Kazarian to win the tournament.

The Knockouts feud entering Genesis was defending champion Gail Kim facing Mickie James, continuing their fight over the TNA Women's Knockout Championship. At Final Resolution, Gail Kim retained the title over James by capitalizing on a distraction from Madison Rayne. On the December 29 and January 5 editions of Impact Wrestling, James was unsuccessful in her attempts to dispossess Kim of the Knockouts Championship and TNA Knockouts Tag Team Championship. However, a rematch between the two for the Knockouts Title was subsequently placed on the Genesis line-up.

Austin Aries was scheduled to defend the TNA X Division Championship against top contenders Kid Kash, Jesse Sorensen, and the winner of a Best of Three Series between Anthony Nese and Zema Ion. Ion won the first match by pinfall, Nese won the second match by pinfall, but Ion won the third in a Contract on a Pole match.

Results

Wild Card Tournament

See also
 2012 in professional wrestling

References

External links
Genesis website
Impact Wrestling.com

Impact Wrestling Genesis
2012 in professional wrestling in Florida
Events in Orlando, Florida
Professional wrestling in Orlando, Florida
January 2012 events in the United States
2012 Total Nonstop Action Wrestling pay-per-view events